Richard T. Mamiya (March 8, 1925 – August 27, 2019) was a heart surgeon. He performed the first heart bypass operation in Hawaii.

Early life and education 
Mamiya was born on March 8, 1925, in Kalihi, Honolulu, Hawaii to Tsurumatsu and Margaret Mamiya. He was a third-generation Japanese American. He attended Saint Louis School on scholarship, where he played on the football, baseball, and basketball teams. He then earned an athletic scholarship to the University of Hawaii at Manoa, where he played as a quarterback. He had a reputation as a skilled athlete, and was later inducted into the UH Sports Hall of Honor. Mamiya also became student body president, and maintained high grades.

Mamiya's zoology professors encouraged him to go to medical school when he graduated in 1950. He studied medicine at St. Louis University School of Medicine, and specialized in heart surgery. After graduation, he worked for a short time at the St. Louis University, then returned to Hawaii.

Career 
Mamiya opened his practice in 1961. In 1965, he helped to establish the John A. Burns School of Medicine.

Mamiya performed the first coronary bypass in Hawaii at Queen's Hospital in 1970. During his career he reduced the amount of time the surgery took from four hours to two while maintaining a mortality rate of less than 1%. He performed more than 30,000 surgeries throughout his career.

Mamiya retired in 1995 and became a philanthropist. Several buildings in Hawaii bear his name, including a theater at Saint Louis School, the science center at the Bishop Museum, and the science center at Punahou School.

Mamiya died on August 27, 2019, at the age of 94.

Personal life 
Mamiya married Hazel M. Ikenaga in 1950, who died on May 23, 1996.

Philanthropy 
Mamiya's desire to give back to the community that supported him throughout his childhood and early adulthood resulted in donations to the following: 

 Mamiya Science Center at Punahou School 
 The Richard T. Mamiya Science Adventure Center at the Bishop Museum
 Richard T. Mamiya Medical Heritage Center at Queens Medical Center 
 The Japanese Cultural Center
 Palama Settlement
 Holy Trinity Church
 The University of Hawaii
 The Honolulu Museum of Art
 Blood Bank of Hawaii
 The American Heart Association 

Through the Richard T. Mamiya Charitable Foundation which he founded, many others have benefited from his charitable contributions.

References 

1925 births
2019 deaths
People from Honolulu

Saint Louis School alumni
University of Hawaiʻi at Mānoa alumni
Saint Louis University alumni
American surgeons
American physicians of Japanese descent